The M-12 motorway, or the Sambrial-Kharian motorway, is a motorway in Pakistan, under construction since July 2022. M-12 will connect Sambrial to Kharian.

References

External links
 National Highway Authority
 Pakistan National Highways & Motorway Police

M12